David Castañeda (born October 24, 1989) is an American actor. In 2019, Castañeda began portraying Diego Hargreeves in the Netflix series The Umbrella Academy.

Early life
Castañeda was born October 24, 1989, in Los Angeles and was raised in Sinaloa, Mexico. He returned to the United States when he was 14 and attended William Workman High School in California. Castañeda initially studied civil engineering in college with the intention of taking over the family business after he finished his studies. However, he became interested in film direction and switched to major in film production and international business in 2007 at California State University, Fullerton. Castañeda then moved into acting and started auditioning for roles. He studied part-time while pursuing an acting career, eventually graduating in 2015.

Career
Castañeda has been involved in acting since he was 17, but only started taking acting more seriously after he volunteered for a role when a director asked for actors to participate in his film during a seminar while at university. He played various minor roles in a number of productions, such as End of Watch, and also acted as a main character in a short film Maddoggin, which won the audience award at the NBC Universal Short Cut Film Festival. In 2013, he landed a role playing Jorge on ABC Family's TV series Switched at Birth. In late 2016, he was cast in the role of Hector in the film Sicario: Day of the Soldado released in 2018.  He also has a major role in an independent film El Chicano, a supporting role in Jean-Claude Van Damme's We Die Young as well as minor roles in films such as the Billy Crystal's film Standing Up, Falling Down.

In 2017, he was cast in his most prominent role yet playing Diego Hargreeves / Number 2 in The Umbrella Academy, which was released on Netflix in February 2019.

Filmography

Film

Television

Notes

References

External links
 
 

1989 births
Living people
Male actors from Los Angeles
21st-century American male actors
California State University, Fullerton alumni
American male actors of Mexican descent